Melvern Dam is a dam in Osage County, Kansas.

The earthen dam was completed in 1970, and the reservoir completely filled in 1975, as a flood control project of the United States Army Corps of Engineers. The dam impounds the Marais des Cygnes River, notorious for its destructive flooding, notably in the Great Flood of 1951.  The dam is 188 feet high, is 9650 feet long at its crest, and is owned and operated by the United States Army Corps of Engineers.

The reservoir it creates, Melvern Lake, has a water surface of 10.8 square miles and a maximum capacity of 363,000 acre-feet, although normal storage is 154,000 acre-feet. Recreation includes fishing, hunting, boating and camping in the five parks surrounding the lake (Outlet Park, Arrow Rock Park, Coeur d'Alene Park, Turkey Point Park, and Sun Dance Park) and the adjoining state park, Eisenhower State Park.

See also
 List of Kansas state parks
 List of lakes, reservoirs, and dams in Kansas
 List of rivers of Kansas

References

External links
 Recreational map of the lake

Dams in Kansas
Reservoirs in Kansas
United States Army Corps of Engineers dams
Buildings and structures in Osage County, Kansas
Dams completed in 1970
Bodies of water of Osage County, Kansas
1970 establishments in Kansas